Wave velocity may refer to:
Phase velocity, the velocity at which a wave phase propagates
Pulse wave velocity, the velocity at which a pulse travels through a medium, usually applied to arteries as a measure of arterial stiffness
Group velocity, the propagation velocity for the envelope of wave groups and often of wave energy, different from the phase velocity for dispersive waves
Signal velocity, the velocity at which a wave carries information
Front velocity, the velocity at which the first rise of a pulse above zero moves forward